Claude Hennessey Bourque (March 31, 1915 — May 13, 1982) was a Canadian  ice hockey goaltender who played 62 games in the National Hockey League with the Montreal Canadiens and Detroit Red Wings between 1938 and 1940. The rest of his career, which lasted from 1935 to 1943, was spent in various minor and senior leagues. Bourque was born in Oxford, Nova Scotia.

Career statistics

Regular season and playoffs

External links

1915 births
1982 deaths
Buffalo Bisons (AHL) players
Canadian ice hockey goaltenders
Detroit Red Wings players
Ice hockey people from Nova Scotia
Kansas City Greyhounds players
Montreal Canadiens players
New Haven Eagles players
People from Cumberland County, Nova Scotia
Philadelphia Ramblers players